Ali Akbar Ostad-Asadi (born 17 September 1965 in Tabriz) is a retired Iranian football player.
During his career, he played for two clubs, Zob Ahan FC and Mashin Sazi of Tabriz, for both of which he was a captain.

He made 51 appearances for the Iran national football team and was a member of the team in the 1998 FIFA World Cup.

References

1965 births
Living people
Sportspeople from Tabriz
Iranian footballers
Machine Sazi F.C. players
1996 AFC Asian Cup players
1998 FIFA World Cup players
Iran international footballers
Zob Ahan Esfahan F.C. players
Association football defenders